Robert Leeves (about 1685–1743) was an English politician who sat as Member of the Parliament of Great Britain for the constituency of Steyning in Sussex from 24 April 1713 to 8 August 1713 and again from 1715 to 12 April 1717.

References 

1685 births
1743 deaths
Members of the Parliament of Great Britain for English constituencies
Place of birth missing